Ángel Jesús Mejías Rodríguez (born 1 March 1959) is a Spanish retired footballer who played as a goalkeeper.

Playing career
Born in Tembleque, Province of Toledo, Mejías joined Atlético Madrid from hometown club CD Toledo, spending his first two seasons as a senior with the reserves, the second in Segunda División. He made his official debut for the first team on 21 February 1982 in a 0–1 home loss to FC Barcelona, and began being regularly played from his second season in La Liga onwards.

After the emergence of Abel Resino at the Colchoneros, Mejías became the backup, appearing in only 15 league matches over seven seasons. Due to injury to his teammate, he was in goal for the 1991 final of the Copa del Rey, won 1–0 against RCD Mallorca in extra time, conquering his second winner's medal in the competition. He left the club in June 1993 at the age of 34, still playing five more years (including four with CF Rayo Majadahonda) in the lower leagues until his retirement.

Coaching career
Subsequently, Mejías returned to Atlético, working as goalkeeper coach. After leaving he joined, in the same capacity, neighbours Rayo Vallecano.

Honours
Atlético Madrid
Copa del Rey: 1984–85, 1990–91; Runner-up 1986–87
Supercopa de España: 1985; Runner-up 1991, 1992
UEFA Cup Winners' Cup runner-up: 1985–86

Rayo Majadahonda
Tercera División: 1995–96, 1996–97

References

External links

1959 births
Living people
Sportspeople from the Province of Toledo
Spanish footballers
Footballers from Castilla–La Mancha
Association football goalkeepers
La Liga players
Segunda División players
Segunda División B players
Tercera División players
CD Toledo players
Atlético Madrid B players
Atlético Madrid footballers
Talavera CF players
CF Rayo Majadahonda players
Atlético Madrid non-playing staff